"Australiana" is a spoken-word comedy single by Austen Tayshus, written by Billy Birmingham and recorded live at The Comedy Store, Sydney, in 1983. It was only available on 12-inch records. It was the No. 1 single in Australia in 1983 for eight weeks, seven of them consecutive.

The single was banned in Victoria for a week, due to the B-side "The Comedy Commando". This led to a gap between the record's first number one placing (15 August) and its seven-week run at the number one spot (5 September – 17 October).

The single was rereleased on CD in 2003 (EMI 7243 5 52755 0 9), containing the A-side and the video for the A-side, but not the original B-side.

Sketch structure 

The sketch is built on extensive sets of equivocations that form puns relating to Australian place names and icons, for example:

My mate, Boomer, rang. Said he was having a few people around for a Barbie. Will Walla be there?  Vegie might come.  Let's go, Anna. Only if Din goes. Nulla bores me. Speak ill of Warra. Ayers rock in. Alice springs into action. Thanks, Warra, ta. Has Eucum been in?  Wait until Gum leaves. On the lawn, Ceston. Marie knows. Leave Jack around a party. Adel laid it on me. Do you wanna game of euchre, Lyptus? Can Wom bat? Can Tenta field? Dar wins every time. Is Bass straight? Swim in the River, Ina. I've got no cossie, Oscar. Without a thread, Bo.  Perish the thought.  No cooler bar maid. Where can Marsu pee, Al? You reek of Stockade. Cook a burra. A pair of queens land in. Crack on to Woomba. Try to mount Isa. Trying to plait her puss. Flash your wanger at her. What'll 'ey care? Seen a cock or two. Pack Bill a bong. Will a didgery do?  Where's the Tally-ho, Bart? Great, Barry—a reefer, What is it mate? Noosa Heads of course. Blew Mountains away. Lord! How?  Hey! Man! How much can a Koala bear? Lead you astray, Liana.

Track listing
 Vinyl (RRT 606)
Side A "Australiana" 
Side B "The Comedy Commando"

CD single (5527550)
 "Australiana" - 4:23
 "Australiana" (CD Rom) - 4:27

Charts

Weekly charts

Year-end charts

Certifications

See also
 List of number-one singles in Australia during the 1980s

References 

Sources
  NOTE: Used for Australian singles and albums charting from 1970 until ARIA created their own charts in mid-1988.

Number-one singles in Australia
1983 singles
1983 in Australia
Australian comedy
Spoken word
Songs about Australia